King George VI was the monarch of the United Kingdom, the Dominions, and the British Empire from 11 December 1936 until his death on 6 February 1952.

He also was a founder and the first Head of the Commonwealth of Nations.

During his reign George was served by a total of 32 prime ministers; 4 from the United Kingdom, 7 from Australia, 2 from Canada, 1 from Ceylon, 1 from India, 2 from Ireland, 3 from Malta, 3 from New Zealand, 3 from Northern Ireland, 2 from Pakistan, 3 from South Africa and 1 from Southern Rhodesia.

List of prime ministers

Australia

Canada

Ceylon

India

Irish Free State

Malta

New Zealand

Northern Ireland

Pakistan

South Africa

Southern Rhodesia

United Kingdom

References 

|-

|-

|-

|-

|-

|-

|-

|-

|-

See also
 British Empire
 Constitutional monarchy
 Commonwealth of Nations

British Empire-related lists
Commonwealth realms
George VI, Prime Ministers
George VI
George VI